Gabriel Macuvele, commonly known as Gabito (born 4 February 1981), is a Mozambican footballer who plays for Moçambola side C.D. Maxaquene and the Mozambican national football team as a defender.

Gabito started his career in 2000 at the age of 19. He has played for several clubs in Mozambique which include Costa do Sol, Atlético Muçulmano and Liga Muçulmana. Macuvele had a stint abroad in Sudan from 2003 to 2005 playing for Al-Hilal Club.

References

External links
 

1981 births
Living people
Sportspeople from Maputo
Mozambican footballers
Association football defenders
Mozambique international footballers
Mozambican expatriate footballers
Expatriate footballers in Sudan
Al-Hilal Club (Omdurman) players
CD Costa do Sol players
Liga Desportiva de Maputo players
Mozambique A' international footballers
2014 African Nations Championship players